Diolinoir is a variety of red wine grape. It was created by André Jaquinet at Station Fédérale de Recheres en Production Végétale de Changins in 1970 by crossing Rouge de Diolly and Pinot noir.

Diolinoir has very good resistance to rot and has an intermediate ripening time. It is more often used in cuvées than on its own.

Synonyms
Diolinoir is also known under the synonyms Dioli Noir and Pully 4-42.

References

Red wine grape varieties